Neapolitan Nights is an album by saxophonist Willis Jackson which was recorded in 1962 and released on the Prestige label.

Reception

Allmusic awarded the album 3 stars.

Track listing 
 "Neapolitan Nights" (Traditional) – 7:00   
 "Arrivederci Roma" (Renato Rascel, Pietro Garinei, Sandro Giovannini) – 5:43    
 "Mama" (Cesare Andrea Bixio)    
 "Volare" (Franco Migliacci, Domenico Modugno)     
 "Al di là" (Carlo Donida, Mogol) -4:46 
 "Verdi's Dance" (Willis Jackson)

Personnel 
Willis Jackson – tenor saxophone
Gildo Mahones – piano
Bucky Pizzarelli – guitar 
George Tucker – bass
Bobby Donaldson – drums
Montego Joe – congas

References 

Willis Jackson (saxophonist) albums
1963 albums
Prestige Records albums
Albums recorded at Van Gelder Studio
Albums produced by Ozzie Cadena